KKIA may refer to:

 Kenneth Kaunda International Airport, Lusaka, Zambia
 King Khalid International Airport, Riyadh, Saudi Arabia
 Kota Kinabalu International Airport, Sabah Malaysia
 KKIA (FM), a radio station (92.9 FM) licensed to Ida Grove, Iowa, United States